Kazimierz Czarnecki (born 5 March 1948 in Ostróda) is a Polish former weightlifter who competed in the 1976 Summer Olympics.

References

1948 births
Living people
Polish male weightlifters
Olympic weightlifters of Poland
Weightlifters at the 1976 Summer Olympics
Olympic bronze medalists for Poland
Olympic medalists in weightlifting
People from Ostróda County
Sportspeople from Warmian-Masurian Voivodeship
Medalists at the 1976 Summer Olympics
21st-century Polish people
20th-century Polish people